Nekoř is a municipality and village in Ústí nad Orlicí District in the Pardubice Region of the Czech Republic. It has about 1,000 inhabitants.

Administrative parts
Villages of Bredůvka and Údolí are administrative parts of Nekoř.

References

Villages in Ústí nad Orlicí District